Patronis may refer to:
Patronis, an ancient town mentioned by Plutarch, generally identified with Troneia
Jimmy Patronis (born 1972), chief financial officer of Florida